The UK Albums Chart is a weekly record chart based on album sales from Friday to Thursday in the United Kingdom. The Official Charts Company (OCC) defines an "album" as being a type of music release that feature more than four tracks and last longer than 25 minutes; sales of albums in the UK are recorded on behalf of the British music industry by the OCC and compiled weekly as the UK Albums Chart.

The chart is based on both physical and digital album sales, as well as audio streaming, and each week's new number one is first announced every Friday on The Official Chart on BBC Radio 1, which is currently hosted by Scott Mills. The album chart is published online by Radio 1 (Top 40), in Music Week magazine (Top 75), and on the OCC website (Top 100). Lewis Capaldi was the first artist to top the albums chart in the 2020s with Divinely Uninspired to a Hellish Extent. In July 2020, On Sunset by Paul Weller became the 1200th album to ever top the UK Albums Chart. In December 2022, This Is What I Mean by Stormzy became the 1300th album to ever top the UK Albums Chart.

The following albums have all been number one in the United Kingdom during the 2020s.

Number-one albums

Artists with the most number ones in the 2020s
The following artists have had more than one album number-one album in the 2020s. Taylor Swift reached the top position in August 2020 with Folklore, December 2020 with Evermore, April 2021 with Fearless (Taylor's Version), November 2021 with Red (Taylor's Version) and in October 2022 with Midnights. Drake reached the top position in May 2020 with Dark Lane Demo Tapes, September 2021 with Certified Lover Boy and in November 2022 with the collaborative album Her Loss. The Killers reached the top position in August 2020 with Imploding the Mirage and in August 2021 with Pressure Machine. Paul Weller reached the top position in July 2020 with On Sunset and in May 2021 with Fat Pop (Volume 1). The Weeknd reached the top position in March 2020 with After Hours and in January 2022 with Dawn FM. Michael Bublé returned to number one in January 2021 with Christmas, originally reaching number one in November 2011, and in April 2022 with Higher. Blossoms reached number one in February 2020 with Foolish Loving Spaces and in May 2022 with Ribbon Around the Bomb. Liam Gallagher reached number one in June 2020 with MTV Unplugged (Live at Hull City Hall) and in June 2022 with  C'mon You Know. Yungblud reached number one in December 2020 with Weird! and in September 2022 with Yungblud. 5 Seconds of Summer reached number one in April 2020 with Calm and in September 2022 with 5SOS5. The duo of Paul Heaton and Jacqui Abbott reached number one in March 2020 with Manchester Calling and in October 2022 with N.K-Pop. The 1975 reached number one in May 2020 with Notes on a Conditional Form and in October 2022 with Being Funny in a Foreign Language. Stormzy reached number one in January 2020 with  Heavy Is the Head and in December 2022 with This Is What I Mean. The Lathums reached number one in October 2021 with  How Beautiful Life Can Be and in March 2023 with From Nothing to a Little Bit More.

  Originally reached number one in the 2010s, but went to number one again during the 2020s.

Albums with the most weeks at number one
The following albums spent at least three weeks at number one during the 2020s.

Artists with the most weeks at number one
Nine different artists have spent three weeks or more at number one on the album chart so far during the 2020s. Taylor Swift has spent the most weeks at number one, with a total of 12 weeks.

By record label
Eight different record labels have spent five weeks or more at number one on the album chart so far during the 2020s.

Christmas number ones

In the UK, Christmas number one albums are those that are at the top of the UK Albums Chart on Christmas Day. Typically, this will refer to the album that was announced as number one on the Friday before 25 December—when Christmas Day falls on a Friday itself, the official number one is considered by the OCC to be the one announced on that day's chart. During the 2020s, the following albums were Christmas number ones.

See also
 List of UK Singles Chart number ones of the 2020s

Notes

References

External links
Official Albums Chart Top 100 at the Official Charts Company
The Official UK Top 40 Albums Chart at BBC Radio 1

2020s in British music
United Kingdom Albums
2020s